The Pan American Cyclo-cross Championships are the continental cycling championships for cyclo-cross held annually for member nations of the Pan American Cycling Confederation. Riders competing in the championships are selected by the national governing body. The championships were first held in 2014 and have taken place annually since except for in 2020.

Locations

Winners

Men

Elite

Under-23

Junior

Women

Elite

Under-23

Junior

References 

Cyclo-cross races
Cyclo-Cross Championships
Cycle racing in North America
Cycle racing in South America
Recurring sporting events established in 2014